The Ervelä railway station is a station located in the village of Ervelä in the town of Salo (formerly the municipality of Perniö), Finland. It is located along the Helsinki–Turku railway, and is currently only used as a passing loop; the nearest station with passenger services is Salo in the north.

History

First station 
Ervelä was opened as a laituri (a staffed halt, translating to "platform") on 16 October 1909, from the initiative of a local retail cooperative first made in 1907. Later on, it became apparent that the station's location could not accommodate a rail yard, and so in 1919, the station was moved further west to the approximate location of kilometer marker 123, as had been proposed before. This also prompted the moving of the station building to the northern side of the railway, from its south.

Passenger services in Ervelä were discontinued on 22 May 1977, and the only remaining switch was dismantled in November 1981, which prompted the cessation of the operating point on 1 January 1982. The station and its former siding were however briefly used during trackwork operations in 1987.

As a passing loop 
The location of the line shifted notably in the vicinity of the old station, and thus the station building now lies further away from the railway than it did before.

Architecture 
The station building in Ervelä was constructed in 1909, and is representative of Jugendstil in its architecture. In 2006, the old station premises were purchased from the Railway Administration by a private buyer, who has since worked on renovating and restoring the station building.

References

Salo, Finland
Defunct railway stations in Finland
Railway stations in Southwest Finland
Railway stations opened in 1909
Railway stations closed in 1982